Mawthorpe is a hamlet in the East Lindsey district of Lincolnshire, England. It is in the civil parish of Willoughby with Sloothby.

Hamlets in Lincolnshire
East Lindsey District